Stará Bystrica is a village and municipality in Čadca District in the Žilina Region of Northern Slovakia. It is the home to the world's youngest astronomical clock, completed in 2009.

History 

In historical records, the village was first mentioned in 1417.

Geography 

The municipality lies at an altitude of 484 metres and covers an area of 36.909 km². As of 2004, its population was 2,679.

Astronomical clock

During the reconstruction of the town square, an astronomical clock was built in the municipality; it was completed in 2009.

The astronomical clock has the shape of a stylized form of Our Lady of Sorrows, patron of Slovakia; it has been described as the largest wooden statue of Slovakia. Its exterior is decorated by statues of important figures from Slovakia's history: Prince Pribina, King Svatopluk, Anton Bernolák, Ľudovít Štúr, Milan Rastislav Štefánik, Andrej Hlinka. Each hour, statuettes of saints connected with Slovakia appear: Cyril, Methodius, Andrew-Zorard, Benedict, Gorazd, Bystrík and Adalbert. The bells of the clock carry the names Sv. Juraj (St. George) and Riečnická Madona (Our Lady of Riečnica); the first is rung to indicate the time, the second accompanies the saints.

The astronomical part of the clock consists of an astrolabe displaying the astrological signs, positions of the Sun and Moon, and the lunar phases. The clock is controlled by computer using DCF77 signals.

Notes and references

 Stará Bystrica a okolie by Oskár Dubovický and Ján Podmanický. Published by Print-Servis Bratislava 1998. (in Slovak) .

External links

Stará Bystrica website
Statistics

Villages and municipalities in Čadca District